Daniel Hurley may refer to:

 Daniel T. K. Hurley (born 1943), American lawyer and judge
 Daniel Hurley (American football), American football player